Giovanni Battista Natali (1628-1687) was a Roman Catholic prelate who served as Bishop of Ston (1683–1687).

Biography
Giovanni Battista Natali was born in Ragusa and ordained a priest in the Order of Preachers. On 15 Nov 1683, he was appointed by Pope Innocent XI as Bishop of Ston. He served as Bishop of Ston until his death on 4 August 1687.

See also
Catholic Church in Croatia

References

1608 births
1687 deaths
17th-century Roman Catholic bishops in Croatia
Bishops appointed by Pope Innocent XI
Dominican bishops